Calendario del castagnajo (English: Chestnut grower's calendar) is a book by Florentine writer Marco Lastri, published in 1793. The full title of the text is: . (English: "Calendar of the chestnut grower, in which the monthly growth of the chestnut tree is described Written by Lastri, the book talks about how to grow the plant, which feeds the people of the countryside (though it has been neglected in Italy). It also talks about rules for grinding chestnuts, and methods to preserve the flour".)

Summary 
Castagnajo's calendar is made up of 13 volumes. These books offer a complete course on the cultivation of chestnut trees in Italy. The introduction provides an overview of the importance of chestnut flour and its role helping people to survive. The subsequent 12 books represent the twelve months of the year. In summary, the 13 volumes teach readers the methods of growing and harvesting a chestnut orchard by instructing which months are best for grafting, pruning and irrigation. It includes information on chestnut-derived products: ink, flour, tables, baskets, coal and fodder.

Editions 
  First edition: Lastri M., 1793. . In Venezia: nella stamperia Graziosi a S. Apollinare (Con Pubblica Approvazione).
 Second edition: Lastri M., 1805. . (Nuova edizione accresciuta). In Venezia: nella stamperia Graziosi a S. Apollinare.

References 

Italian books